Carlos Motta (born 1978) is a Colombian-born, New York-based artist. Motta has an interdisciplinary practice making work in film, photography and sculpture.  Motta's practice challenges dominant ideas about sexuality and gender using a myriad of archival material, art historical references, and the body.

Early life and education 
Motta was born and raised in Bogotá, Colombia. He received a BFA from The School of Visual Arts in 2001 and an MFA from Bard College in 2003. Motta attended the Whitney Museum Independent Study Program two years later.

Work 
In 2008, Motta had his first show in Philadelphia at the Institute of Contemporary Art. Titled Carlos Motta: The Good Life, the large-scale documentary project, which began in 2005, explored the history and effects of US interventionist policies in Latin America. More than 300  interviews were conducted between the artist and civilians in 12 different Latin American cities.

In 2009, Motta had his first a solo exhibition in New York at MoMA PS1, New York, titled On-site 1: Carlos Motta. The exhibition included two newspapers and black vinyl mural and investigated the School of the Americas (SOA)-a Cold War institution sponsored by the U.S. government to train Latin American soldiers in counterinsurgency tactics and various military tactics.

One year later, Motta showed at the Museo de Arte del Banco de la República in Bogotá.

In 2012, the artist began working on the database documentary wewhofeeldifferently.info as part of the New Museum's Museum as Hub program. The culmination of the project, titled We Who Feel Differently, approached and re-negotiated the idea of sexual and gender "difference" in terms of greater equality. The project included an exhibition, several public events, and symposium with guest speakers.

At The Tanks in 2013, Motta organized the symposium Gender Talents: A Special Address which included artists and activists like Esben Esther Pirelli Benestad, Giuseppe Campuzano, J. Jack Halberstam, Beatriz Preciado, Dean Spade, Wu Tsang & Safra Project, Del LaGrace Volcano and more.

Motta has frequently exhibited with Galerie Vermelho, São Paulo, Brazil, and P.P.O.W. Gallery, New York, New York.

A monograph of Motta's work will be published in early 2020 by SKIRA. The book will feature essays by Hendrik Folkerts, Andrea Giunta, Miguel A. López, and Agustín Pérez Rubio.

Selected solo exhibitions 

 Carlos Motta: We The Enemy, Mary Porter Sesnon Gallery, University of California Santa Cruz, 2020
 Carlos Motta: We Got Each Other’s Back, Portland Institute of Contemporary Art (PICA), 2020
 Carlos Motta: Billboard from “50 State Initiative”, Judd Foundation, New York, in collaboration with For Freedoms, 2020
 Dialogues: David Wojnarowicz and Carlos Motta, P.P.O.W Gallery at ARCO, Madrid, 2019
 Carlos Motta: Conatus, P.P.O.W Gallery, New York, 2019
 Carlos Motta, Galeria Vermelho, São Paulo, 2019
 Carlos Motta: Deseos, Galeria Vermelho, São Paulo, 2018
 Carlos Motta: The Psalms, Discoveries, Art Basel Hong Kong with Mor Charpentier Galerie, Paris, 2018
 Carlos Motta: Petrificado, CDAN— Centro de Arte y Naturaleza, Fundación Beulas, Huesca, 2018
 Carlos Motta. Formas de libertad, Centro Cultural Matucana 100, Santiago de Chile, 2018
 Carlos Motta: L’oeuvre du Diable, Mor Charpentier Galerie, Paris, 2018
 Carlos Motta: Corpo Fechado, Galeria Avenida da Índia (EGEAC), Lisbon, 2018
 Carlos Motta. Formas de libertad, Museo de Arte Moderno de Medellín (MAMM), 2017
 Carlos Motta: Lágrimas, Museo de Arte de la Universidad Nacional at the Claustro de San Agustín, Bogotá, 2017
 The SPIT! Manifesto (with SPIT! (Carlos Motta, John Arthur Peetz and Carlos Maria Romero)), Frieze Projects, London, 2017
 Carlos Motta: The Crossing, Stedelijk Museum, Amsterdam, 2017
 Carlos Motta: Desviaciones, Centro Cultural Gabriel García Márquez / Colombian Embassy in Spain, Madrid in collaboration with Mor Charpentier Galerie, Paris, 2017
 Beloved Martina..., Mercer Union, Toronto, 2016
 Deviations, P.P.O.W Gallery, New York, 2016
 Histories for the Future, Pérez Art Museum (PAMM), Miami, 2016
 Desires, Hordaland Kunssenter, Bergen, 2016
 For Democracy There Must Be Love, Röda Sten Konsthall, Gothenburg, 2015
 Désirs, Mor.Charpentier Galerie, Paris, 2015
 Patriots, Citizens, Lovers…, PinchukArtCentre, Kiev, 2015
Gender Talents (in the context of Charming for the Revolution: A Congress for Gender Talents and Wildness), The Tanks, Tate Modern, London (co-presented with Electra), 2013
 The Movers (with Matthias Sperling), The Tanks, Tate Modern, London, 2013
 ritual of queer rituals (with AA Bronson), Witte de With, Rotterdam, 2013
 Museum as Hub: Carlos Motta: We Who Feel Differently, New Museum, New York, 2012
The Immigrant Files: Democracy Is Not Dead, It Just Smells Funny, Konsthall C, Stockholm, Sweden, Baltic Art Center (BAC), Visby, Swede, 2009

References

External links 
 Carlos Motta – official website
 Carlos Motta on PPOW Gallery

1978 births
Living people
People from Bogotá
School of Visual Arts alumni
Bard College alumni
Colombian documentary filmmakers
Colombian sculptors
Colombian photographers